Presidential elections were held in El Salvador on 3 January 1939. Maximiliano Hernández Martínez was the only candidate, and won unopposed.

Results

References

Bibliography
Anderson, Thomas P (1971) Matanza: El Salvador's communist revolt of 1932 Lincoln: University of Nebraska Press
Parker, Franklin D (1981) The Central American republics Westport: Greenwood Press
Political Handbook of the world, 1940 New York, 1941
Williams, Philip J. and Knut Walter (1997) Militarization and demilitarization in El Salvador's transition to democracy Pittsburgh: University of Pittsburgh Press

El Salvador
Presidential elections in El Salvador
President
Single-candidate elections
Election and referendum articles with incomplete results